Neova Oy (formerly Vapo Oy) is a Finnish state-owned company. In 2021, approximately two-thirds of the company’s turnover was derived from refined growing media sold under the Kekkilä brand, among others. The company’s other key products included activated carbon produced from peat, and wood-based fuels.

The Finnish state owns 50.1% of Neova, with the rest being held by Suomen Energiavarat Oy (SEV), which is owned by Finnish energy companies.

History

From Timber Office to Valtion Polttoainetoimisto (State Fuel Office), Vapo (1940–1950) 
The outbreak of World War II made it more difficult for government offices to acquire fuel in Finland. In January 1940, state-owned companies’ procurement of firewood and timber was concentrated in the temporarily expanded Timber Office of the National Board of Railways. The Timber Office’s activities were expanded and it began to operate under the Ministry of Supply. The office was responsible for the fuel supply of the state-owned railway company VR as well as the military, government agencies, industrial plants, and the country’s three largest cities. At the end of the war, Vapo was responsible for about a quarter of Finland’s fuel supply.

In 1945, the company’s name was changed to Valtion Polttoainetoimisto (State Fuel Office) and the acronym VAPO was introduced. Approximately five million cubic metres of timber were felled, and the felling employed more than 30,000 people. In the mid-1940s, Vapo began supplying the state with fuel peat.

When fuels started to be imported to Finland from abroad in the summer of 1948, the need for firewood decreased. In 1949, Vapo became an intermediary for imported fuels such as coal and coke.

From Valtionrautateiden Polttoainetoimisto (State Railways Fuel Office) to Valtion Polttoainekeskus (State Fuel Centre) (1950–1969) 
In April 1950, the company was renamed as Valtionrautateiden Polttoainetoimisto, or State Railways Fuel Office. The number of the company’s own timber vehicles was reduced, the log driving was discontinued, and shipping activities were scaled down. The company’s first sawmill was opened in Mikkeli in 1954. In 1956, Vapo began sourcing fuel oil from abroad.

In the early 1960s, VR accounted for nearly two-thirds of Vapo’s total turnover. The company acquired the Hankasalmi sawmill in 1962. In 1963, the company’s name was changed back to Valtion polttoainetoimisto, and the acronym VAPO was formalised. In 1968, the company’s name was changed to Valtion polttoainekeskus (State Fuel Centre) and it was transferred under the Ministry of Trade and Industry. Vapo was commissioned to maintain stockpiles of liquid fuels. In 1969, Vapo acquired Suo Oy. In the transaction, Vapo acquired a few operational peat bogs, plenty of mires, and production equipment. Parliament gave Vapo the task of acquiring new peat users. The city of Kuopio became Vapo’s first major customer for fuel peat.

Vapo (1970–1999) 
Significant amounts of state-owned land were transferred to Vapo.

In January 1984, Vapo became a limited liability company that is fully owned by the Finnish state. Vapo’s horticultural peat business and Kekkilä Oy merged in 1994. 

Vapo started its wind power production in 1998, when three 750-kilowatt wind power plants were built in the Kuivaniemi wind farm on the island of Kuivamatala.

In 1999, Vapo acquired Forssan Energia Oy.

Vapo (2000–2010) 

Metsäliitto became a part-owner of Vapo in 2002 when the State sold a third of the company to the cooperative. Also at that time, Metsäliitto sold Biowatti Oy’s pellet business to Vapo and the rest of the company to Lassila & Tikanoja.

In 2009, Metsäliitto sold its entire holding in Vapo to Suomen Energiavarat Oy. The company had become one of the largest pellet producers in Europe, the world’s largest peat producer, the third-largest sawmill operator in Finland, and the leading provider of growing media in the Nordic market.

Vapo (2011–2021) 
Forssan Energia, a company established by Valkeakosken Energia and Sallila Energia, acquired the Vapo Sähkömyynti electricity sales business in April 2011. Vapo Oy made the environmental responsibility of peat production a focal point of its strategy and offered 2,300 hectares of its own natural-state bogs to be protected. The company acquired BVB Substrates and a merger was carried out between Kekkilä and BVB Substrates. Kekkilä-BVB employed 500 people. To raise more capital for implementing the company’s new strategy, Vapo sold its energy company Nevel to the French private investment company Ardian. The transaction was announced in November and had a value of 656 million euros. 

The Nevel transaction was completed in January 2021.

Neova Oy (2021–) 
In April 2021, the company announced that it would change its name to Neova Oy. The change of name took effect in May. In April 2022 the company said it would restart cutting for peat energy in Finland, due to the reduction in wood imports from Russia.

Criticism 
In 2013, opponents of peat production claimed that the media was publishing articles that downplay the adverse impacts of peat and are aimed at improving Vapo’s reputation. The Finnish Association of Nature Conversation claimed that Vapo was applying for permits for its operations based on erroneous measurements taken at watercourses In 2019, the Geological Survey of Finland published a study of 62 lakes, according to which peat production does not increase sediment,  i.e. gyttja with a high humus content, in lakes. In 2020, the Finnish government stated that the energy use of peat must be halved by 2030. According to Vapo, taxes and the price of emission rights reduced the demand for energy peat faster than expected, resulting in the target being reached even before 2025.

In December 2021, Neova announced that it would discontinue the production of energy peat, i.e. milled fuel peat, in 2022. In its financial statements, the company recognised write-downs of 16.2 million euros in balance sheet items related to the production of energy peat. The decision to discontinue the production of energy peat was motivated by the new energy taxation and the price of emission rights increasing manyfold, which made the production of energy peat unprofitable.

References

External links 
 

Government-owned companies of Finland